Out of the Storm is the debut album led by American drummer Ed Thigpen recorded in 1966 for the Verve label.

Reception

The Allmusic review by Scott Yanow awarded the album 4 stars stating "Unfortunately, there are only 32 minutes of music on this CD (which is highlighted by "Cielito Lindo"), so its brevity keeps it from being too essential, but the performances are enjoyable".

Track listing
All compositions by Ed Thigpen except as indicated
 "Cielito Lindo" (C. Fernandez) - 4:41
 "Cloud Break (Up Blues)" - 1:14
 "Out of the Storm" - 7:27
 "Theme from "Harper"" (Johnny Mandel) - 2:36
 "Elbow and Mouth" (Kenny Burrell) - 6:14
 "Heritage" - 5:15
 "Struttin' With Some Barbecue" (Lil Hardin Armstrong, Don Raye) - 4:22  
Recorded at Van Gelder Studio, Englewood Cliffs, NJ on April 18 (tracks 3 & 4), April 19 (tracks 1, 6 & 7), and April 20 (tracks 2 & 5), 1966

Personnel
Ed Thigpen - drums, voice on "Heritage"
Clark Terry - trumpet, flugelhorn, voice on "Heritage"
Herbie Hancock - piano
Kenny Burrell - guitar
Ron Carter - bass

References

Verve Records albums
Albums produced by Creed Taylor
1966 albums
Albums recorded at Van Gelder Studio